The Dead Don't Hurt is an upcoming western film, written, directed, produced and starring Viggo Mortensen, who appears alongside Vicky Krieps, Solly McLeod, Danny Huston, and Garret Dillahunt.

Synopsis
In the 1860s, French Canadian Vivienne Le Coudy (Krieps) falls in love with Danish immigrant to North America Holger Olsen (Mortensen) in San Francisco but they are separated and kept apart by the Civil War.

Cast
 Viggo Mortensen as Holger Olsen
 Vicky Krieps as Vivienne Le Coudy
 Garret Dillahunt as Alfred Jeffries
 Solly McLeod as Weston Jeffries
 Danny Huston as Mayor Rudolph Schiller
 Lance Henriksen
 Tom Bateman
 W. Earl Brown
 Marc Dennis as Fishmonger Stevens

Production
In October 2022 it was revealed that Mortensen would direct and star in a film he had written, with Vicky Krieps, Solly McLeod, Danny Huston, Tom Bateman, Lance Henriksen, and W. Earl Brown also appearing in the film. Mortensen worked once again with a number of people who worked with him on his previous films including Marcel Zyskind, production designer Carol Spier and art director Jason Clarke, and costume designer Anne Dixon. Krieps described working with Mortensen on the film to The Times as "In the world of westerns there were not many women. So that was very tough. Of all men he is very soft and open and very 'there'. But still it reminded me why I like to work with women." The Dead Don't Hurt began filming in Canada on 12 October 2022 with Canadian locations including Ontario and British Columbia, with filming also taking place in Durango, Mexico. The  project is a joint Talipot Studio, Recorded Picture and Perceval Pictures production. Filming was reportedly finished in December 2022.

Release
HanWay Films is slated to be handling worldwide sales.

References

External links

 

2020s American films
2020s English-language films
Upcoming films
Films shot in Mexico
Films shot in Canada
Films shot in British Columbia
Films shot in Ontario
American Western (genre) films